Bruno Nicolini (born 16 June 1969), better known by his stage name Bénabar, is a French songwriter and singer, who could be compared to Vincent Delerm and other singers from his generation. As many of them he was influenced by Georges Brassens, Renaud, Jacques Higelin and also Tom Waits. His songs describe day-to-day life events with humour and a tender cynicism. His songs are influenced by French chanson and a heavy influence is placed on the piano or the accordion and on typical French fanfare (brass band) for the most upbeat of them. This genre of music is very typically French and differs from most in that emphasis is placed on appreciation of the lyrics and that it is linked to a specific culture of modern "guinche" (slang for "guinguette") appreciated a lot by Bobos among others.

Biography

Bénabar began his career in the cinema, working as an assistant on Le Brasier (1991) before directing three short subjects: Nada Lezard (1991), José Jeannette (1992) and Sursum corda (1994). He then turned to music, working for some time with his friend Patchol who gave him his nickname (Bénabar being the "verlan" of Barnabé, the name he was using on stage). With "Les associés" he sang for several years in small places in France, Belgium, and Switzerland before the release of Bénabar (2001), which raised his profile sufficiently to make him the opening act for Henri Salvador. He was nominated as a Revelation for the "Victoires de la musique 2003" but did not win it. In 2004, after the successful release of Les risques du métier, he won the award for "album "chanson/variété" of the year". His next album Reprise des négociations sold better than the previous ones: according to Le Figaro, Bénabar reached number 4 for CD sales in France, with 2.18 million euros sales in 2006. In 2007 he won the awards for "Male group or artist of the year" and "original song of the year" (for Le dîner).

Personal life

He has two brothers named Patrick and Sébastien. He has a son born in 2004 named Manolo and a daughter born in 2009.

Philanthropy
Bénabar has been a member of the Les Enfoirés charity ensemble since 2007.

Discography

Studio albums

Live albums

Compilations

Singles 

A Chart peak for Ultratip.

Other singles

Filmography 
 2009 : Incognito
 2015 : The Night Watchman
 2019 : Beaux-parents

References

External links

 
Official French site 
Biography of Bénabar on the RFI musique Website (in English)

1969 births
Living people
French male singers
French songwriters
Male songwriters
French people of Corsican descent
French people of Italian descent

People from Thiais